Lophopetalum javanicum is a species of plant in the family Celastraceae. It is found in Indonesia, Malaysia, Papua New Guinea, the Philippines, Thailand, and Vietnam.

Synonyms
Synonyms:

 Hippocratea maingayi (non Laws.) Vidal
Lophopetalum celebicus Koord.
Lophopetalum fimbriatum (non Wight) F. Vill.
Lophopetalum fuscescens Kurz
Lophopetalum intermedium Ridl.
Lophopetalum oblongifolium King
Lophopetalum oblongum King
Lophopetalum paucinervium Merr.
Lophopetalum toxicum Loher
Solenospermum javanicum Zoll.
Solenospermum oblongifolius Loes.
Solenospermum paucinervium Loes.
Solenospermum toxicum Loes.

References

javanicum
Least concern plants
Taxonomy articles created by Polbot
Plants described in 1857
Taxa named by Nikolai Turczaninow
Taxa named by Heinrich Zollinger